Yin Qi (Chinese: 殷琦; born 15 October 1992) is a Chinese long track speed skater.

Qi participated in the 2019 World Single Distance Speed Skating Championships, in the team pursuit event and mass start event, and at the 2020 World Single Distance Speed Skating Championships in the 1500 metres event and 5000 mass start. At the end of the season, she also participated at the 2020 World Allround Speed Skating Championships, finishing 16th overall. She also competes at other international competitions, including at ISU Speed Skating World Cups.

As of 2020, she had been the national champion twice. In 2019 she won the mass start and the team pursuit at the Chinese national championships.

At the 2022 Winter Olympics, she finished 15th in the 1500 metres.

Records

Personal records

References

1992 births
Place of birth missing (living people)
Chinese female speed skaters
Living people
Speed skaters at the 2022 Winter Olympics
Olympic speed skaters of China